The Ministry of Foreign Affairs, African Cooperation and Moroccan Expatriates is the foreign affairs ministry of Morocco, responsible for implementing Morocco's foreign policy and ensuring relations with foreign states.

Its head office is in Rabat and is one of the so-called "regalian" (royal) ministries alongside the ministries of Defense, Justice, Finance and the Interior.

Since 5 April 2017, Nasser Bourita is the incumbent minister, and is assisted by his junior minister, Abdelkrim Benatiq, who serves as the Minister Delegate to the Minister of Foreign Affairs, in charge of Moroccans living abroad and Migration Affairs.

Organization and structure
The ministry was created by Dahir No. 1-56-097 of 26 April 1956, four months after the formation of the government of Mbarek Bekkay, first Prime Minister of the Kingdom of Morocco. The ministry is headed by the Secretary of State, currently Mounia Boucetta since April 2017. As of 2017, the ministry manages and staffs 91 embassies, 53 consulates-general and several Permanent Missions.

List of ministers
Ahmed Balafrej (1956 – 1958)
Abdallah Ibrahim (1958 – 1960)
Driss M'Hammedi (1960 – 1961)
Ahmed Balafrej (1961 – 1963)
Ahmed Réda Guédira (1963 – 1964)
Ahmed Taibi Benhima (1964 – 1966)
Mohamed Cherkaoui (1966 – 1967)
Ahmed Laraki (1967 – 1971)
Abdellatif Filali (1971 – 1972)
Ahmed Taibi Benhima (1972 – 1974)
Ahmed Laraki (1974 – 1977)
M'hamed Boucetta (1977 – 1983)
Abdelouahed Belkeziz (1983 – 1985)
Abdellatif Filali (1985 – 1999)
Mohamed Benaissa (April, 1999 – October 15, 2007)
Taieb Fassi Fihri (October 15, 2007 – January 3, 2012)
Saad-Eddine El Othmani (January 3, 2012 – October 10, 2013)
Salaheddine Mezouar (October 10, 2013 – 5 April 2017)
Nasser Bourita (5 April 2017 – present)

See also 

Diplomatic missions of Morocco
Foreign relations of Morocco
Government of Morocco

Notes

References

External links
 Ministry of Foreign Affairs, African Cooperation and Moroccan Expatriates
 Ministry of Foreign Affairs, African Cooperation and Moroccan Expatriates 
 Ministry of Foreign Affairs, African Cooperation and Moroccan Expatriates 

1956 establishments in Morocco
Politics of Morocco
Government of Morocco
Foreign relations of Morocco
Morocco
Morocco, Foreign Affairs and International Cooperation
Government ministries of Morocco